Jach'a Qullu (Aymara jach'a big, qullu mountain,  "big mountain", also spelled Jacha Kkollu, Jachcha Kkollu) is a  mountain in the Cordillera Real in the Andes of Bolivia. It lies in the La Paz Department, Los Andes Province, Batallas Municipality. Jach'a Qullu is situated southwest of Jisk'a Pata and Jach'a Pata, southwest of Jach'a Juqhu and northwest of Wila Lluxi, Warawarani and Qala T'uxu.

See also
 Chachakumani
 List of mountains in the Andes

References 

Mountains of La Paz Department (Bolivia)